Kappa Draconis, Latinized from κ Draconis, is a blue giant star located in the northern circumpolar constellation of Draco. At an apparent magnitude of 3.88, it is barely visible to the naked eye when artificial lighting from cities is present. Nevertheless, it is a powerful star, approximately five time as massive as the Sun. It is about 460 light-years away, and is 1,400 times brighter than the Sun.

The star is currently located at declination  (right ascension ), but due to the effects of precession, Kappa Draconis was the nearest star to the north celestial pole visible to the naked eye from 1793 BC to approximately 1000 BC, though it was 6° removed from perfect alignment, making it only an approximate pole star, similar to the roughly 7° variance from perfect alignment of the much brighter (magnitude 2.08) star Kochab, at the same time during Earth's precession.

Properties

Kappa Draconis is a classical Be star, displaying Balmer emission lines in its spectrum. It is spinning rapidly with a projected rotational velocity of 170 km/s. The star is thought to be just entering its red giant phase, having exhausted the supply of hydrogen in its core. Over the next several thousand years, the star will expand, becoming more powerful but with a much cooler surface temperature. Tens of thousands of years from now, Kappa Draconis will appear much brighter, probably shining with a reddish hue.

Kappa Draconis is a single-lined spectroscopic binary. The main Be star is orbited by another stellar companion, on a circular orbit with a period of 61.555 days.   The General Catalogue of Variable Stars lists Kappa Draconis as a Gamma Cassiopeiae type star, a type of eruptive irregular variable star, whose visual magnitude varies from 3.82 to 4.01. However Balona and Dziembowsk classify it as a Zeta Ophiuchi star, a type of pulsating variable star, with a primary period of 10.4 hours.

Chinese name
 

References

External links
 Kappa Draconis by Jim Kaler

B-type giants
Be stars
Spectroscopic binaries
Draco (constellation)
Draconis, Kappa
Durchmusterung objects
Draconis, 05
109387
061281
4787
Northern pole stars